Tayler James Scott (born June 1, 1992) is a South African professional baseball pitcher in the Los Angeles Dodgers organization. He has previously played in MLB for the Seattle Mariners, Baltimore Orioles and San Diego Padres and in Nippon Professional Baseball (NPB) for the Hiroshima Toyo Carp. He is the first South African baseball pitcher in MLB and NPB history.

Career
Scott was born and raised in Johannesburg, South Africa. He moved to the United States when he was 16 to attend high school and play baseball. After moving, he attended Notre Dame Prep High School in  Scottsdale, Arizona. Scott initially committed to play college baseball at Arizona.

Chicago Cubs
He was drafted by the Chicago Cubs in the 5th round of the 2011 MLB draft. 

Scott played in the Cubs organization from 2011 through the 2015 season. During his time with them, he played for the AZL Cubs, Boise Hawks, Kane County Cougars, Daytona Cubs, Myrtle Beach Pelicans, and the Tennessee Smokies. He was released by the Cubs on March 30, 2016.

Sioux City Explorers
He signed with the Sioux City Explorers of the independent baseball American Association in April 2016.

Milwaukee Brewers
On July 6, 2016, Scott signed a minor league contract with the Milwaukee Brewers. In 2016 and 2017, he played for the Biloxi Shuckers while in the Brewers organization.

Texas Rangers
On July 31, 2017, he was traded to the Texas Rangers in exchange for Jeremy Jeffress. He played for the Round Rock Express in 2017 and 2018 while in the Rangers organization.

Seattle Mariners
Scott became a free agent after the 2018 season, and signed a minor league contract with the Seattle Mariners on January 24, 2019. He opened the 2019 season with the Tacoma Rainiers. 

Scott was called up to the major leagues for the first time on June 7, 2019. He made his major league debut on June 8, becoming the first South African pitcher in MLB history.

Baltimore Orioles
On June 25, 2019, Scott was claimed off waivers by the Baltimore Orioles. Scott was outrighted off the Orioles roster on October 30, 2019, and became a free agent.

Hiroshima Toyo Carp
On December 1, 2019, Scott signed a one-year contract with the Hiroshima Toyo Carp of Nippon Professional Baseball (NPB). In 2020, Scott struggled to a 15.75 ERA in 7 games for Hiroshima. Scott did not appear.in a regular season game for the Carp in 2021 and became a free agent after the season.

San Diego Padres
On March 7, 2022, Scott signed a minor league contract with the San Diego Padres organization. On September 11, Scott was designated for assignment.

Philadelphia Phillies
On September 14, 2022, Scott was claimed off waivers by the Philadelphia Phillies. He was designated for assignment on December 16, 2022. He elected free agency on December 23, 2022.

Los Angeles Dodgers
On January 7, 2023, Scott signed a minor league contract with the Los Angeles Dodgers.

References

External links

1992 births
Living people
Arizona League Cubs players
Baltimore Orioles players
Biloxi Shuckers players
Boise Hawks players
Daytona Cubs players
El Paso Chihuahuas players
Expatriate baseball players in Japan
Hiroshima Toyo Carp players
Kane County Cougars players
Lehigh Valley IronPigs players
Major League Baseball pitchers
Major League Baseball players from South Africa
Myrtle Beach Pelicans players
Nippon Professional Baseball pitchers
Norfolk Tides players
Round Rock Express players
Salt River Rafters players
San Diego Padres players
Seattle Mariners players
Sioux City Explorers players
South African expatriate baseball players in the United States
South African expatriate sportspeople in Japan
Sportspeople from Johannesburg
Tacoma Rainiers players
Tennessee Smokies players
White South African people